Reagan Robert William Ogle (born 29 March 1999) is an Australian professional footballer who plays as a defender for National League club Scunthorpe United.

Career

Accrington Stanley 
Ogle started his career in the youth system at Accrington Stanley starting a two-year scholarship in the summer of 2015. In November 2016, he made his professional debut in an EFL Trophy group-stage match against Wolverhampton Wanderers U23. He came on as a substitute for Seamus Conneely in the second half in a 4–0 defeat.

In February 2017, Ogle joined Northern Premier League Division One North side Ramsbottom United on loan. He scored on his debut for the club in a 4–0 win over Ossett Albion.

In March 2017, he joined Premier League side Stoke City on trial.

On 23 August 2018, Ogle joined Southport on an initial one-month loan deal, citing that he was "really looking forward to playing some more competitive first team football". After impressing during five starts, Ogle's loan was extended until the end of the 2018–2019 season, with Ogle saying, "I’m pleased that I've been able to put in some good performances. The fans have been great to me and I'm enjoying my football at Southport. I know this club will help me develop into a much better player." Ogle won the Trust in Yellow player of the month for September 2018. On 20 July 2019, Ogle re-joined Southport on loan until January.

On 19 October 2020, Ogle joined AFC Fylde on loan until January. He played six times in all competitions for the club.

On 1 March 2021, Ogle joined National League side Altrincham on a one-month loan. The loan was then extended for the remainder of the 2020-21 season.

Ogle was released by Accrington at the end of the 2020–21 season.

Hartlepool United 
On 12 July 2021, Ogle joined newly promoted League Two side Hartlepool United on a two-year deal. In the 2021–22 season, Ogle made 24 appearances in all competitions for Pools.

Scunthorpe United
At the start of the 2022–22 season, Ogle's first-team opportunities at Hartlepool became limited due to him becoming the club's third-choice right-back. As a result, on 29 July 2022, he signed for National League club Scunthorpe United on a free transfer.

Personal life
Ogle was born in Wollongong, Australia and moved to England when he was 11. He attended Ribblesdale High School in Clitheroe.

Style of play
Ogle predominantly plays at right-back but is a versatile footballer who can also play at left-back, centre-half and as a central midfielder. He is also known for having a long throw-in.

Career statistics

Honours
Accrington Stanley
EFL League One: 2017–18

Southport
Young Player of the Year Award: 2018–19

References

External links
Reagan Ogle profile at the Accrington Stanley F.C. website

1999 births
Living people
Australian soccer players
Association football defenders
Australian expatriate soccer players
Expatriate footballers in England
Australian expatriate sportspeople in England
Accrington Stanley F.C. players
Ramsbottom United F.C. players
Southport F.C. players
Wealdstone F.C. players
AFC Fylde players
Altrincham F.C. players
Hartlepool United F.C. players
Scunthorpe United F.C. players
English Football League players
National League (English football) players
Northern Premier League players